Hylopercnas is a genus of snout moths. It was described by Edward Meyrick in 1934, and contains the species H. eribolax. It is found on Fiji.

References

Phycitinae
Monotypic moth genera
Moths of Fiji